Monotosh Chakladar (born 4 April 1998) is an Indian professional footballer who plays as a defender for Chennaiyin in the Indian Super League.

Club career
Monotosh started his career with the youth academy of United SC. He joined Kolkata giants Mohammedan in 2018 and played in the 2017–18 I-League 2nd Division.

He joined Pathachakra in 2018 and played in the 2018–19 Calcutta Premier Division.

Gokulam Kerala
His good showing for Pathachakra in the 2018–19 Calcutta Premier Division, earned him a loan spell at I-League club Gokulam Kerala.

On 31 October, he made his debut for the club against NEROCA in a 1–1 stalemate. He finished the season with four matches for the Malabarians as they finished 10th in the league table.

Peerless
He returned from the loan and joined Peerless and won the 2019–20 Calcutta Premier Division.

East Bengal
In January 2020, Monotosh signed for I-League club and Kolkata giants East Bengal on loan for the remainder of the season.

He made his only appearance for the club, on 17 February against Indian Arrows, coming on as a 87th-minute substitute for Asheer Akhtar in a 3–1 win.

Chennaiyin
On 4 June 2022, Chennaiyin confirmed the signing of Monotosh ahead of the upcoming Indian Super League season.

Career statistics

Club

Honours

Club
Peerless SC
Calcutta Football League: 2019-20

References

External links

1998 births
Living people
Footballers from West Bengal
Indian footballers
I-League players
East Bengal Club players
Association football central defenders
Mohammedan SC (Kolkata) players
Gokulam Kerala FC players
Bhawanipore FC players